Stroudsburg–Pocono Airport  is a privately owned, public use airport located three nautical miles (6 km) north of the central business district of East Stroudsburg, a borough in Monroe County, Pennsylvania, United States. This airport was included in the National Plan of Integrated Airport Systems for 2009–2013, which categorized it as a general aviation facility.

Facilities and aircraft 
Stroudsburg–Pocono Airport covers an area of 69 acres (28 ha) at an elevation of 480 feet (146 m) above mean sea level. It has one runway designated 8/26 with an asphalt surface measuring 3,087 by 30 feet (941 x 9 m).

For the 12-month period ending January 13, 2012, the airport had 18,820 aircraft operations, an average of 51 per day: 99.9% general aviation and 0.1% military.
At that time there were 34 aircraft based at this airport: 88% single-engine, 6% multi-engine, and 6% helicopter.

The airport is home to the busy "Sky's The Limit" Skydiving Center, which operates six days a week (Wednesday thru Monday) from April thru November. The center regularly flies a twin-turboprop de Havilland DHC-6 Twin Otter, a turboprop-powered Cessna 208 Caravan, and a piston-powered Cessna 182 Skylane — all configured for skydiving operations.  The airport is also home to Lehigh Valley Health Network MedEvac 2. MedEvac 2 is the primary medical helicopter for Monroe, Pike, and Northampton Counties.

References

External links 
 Stroudsburg Pocono Airport (N53) at Pennsylvania DOT Bureau of Aviation
 Aerial image as of April 1999 from USGS The National Map
 

Airports in Pennsylvania
Transportation buildings and structures in Monroe County, Pennsylvania